Henning Schulzrinne is a German-American computer scientist, who led research and development of the voice over IP network protocols.

Life
Schulzrinne studied engineering management at the Department of Electrical Engineering and Information Technology of the German Technische Universität Darmstadt in Darmstadt, where he earned his Vordiplom (cf. Diplom), then went on to earn his M.Sc. at the University of Cincinnati and his Ph.D. at the University of Massachusetts Amherst.
From 1992 to 1994 he worked for AT&T Bell Laboratories.
From 1994 to 1996 he worked in Berlin at the Forschungs-Institut für Offene Kommunikationssysteme (GMD FOKUS), an institute of the now-defunct Gesellschaft für Mathematik und Datenverarbeitung (GMD) which became part of the Fraunhofer Society as Fraunhofer Institute for Open Communication Systems. He joined the faculty of the Computer Science department at Columbia University in 1998, and served as chair and Julian Clarence Levi Professor. 

He is a co-chair of the Internet Technical Committee of the IEEE Communications Society.
Schulzrinne is an editor of the Journal of Communications and Networks.

Schulzrinne has contributed to standards for voice over IP (VoIP). He co-designed the Session Initiation Protocol along with Mark Handley, the Real Time Streaming Protocol, the Real-time Transport Protocol, the General Internet Signaling Transport protocol,
part of the Next Steps in Signaling protocol suite. Overall, as of November 5, 2015,  his publications have been cited over 45,000 times, and he has an h-index of 80.

Schulzrinne was the chief technology officer (CTO) for the United States Federal Communications Commission, from December 19, 2011 to 2014.  
He was elected as an Association for Computing Machinery (ACM) Fellow in 2014 for contributions to the design of protocols, applications, and algorithms for Internet multimedia.

References

External links
Personal website

Columbia University faculty
Columbia School of Engineering and Applied Science faculty
Living people
German computer scientists
German expatriates in the United States
Scientists from Cologne
Chief technology officers
Year of birth missing (living people)
Technische Universität Darmstadt alumni
Federal Communications Commission personnel
Obama administration personnel